Latergaz-e Olya (also Romanized as Latergāz-e ‘Olyā; also known as Latergāz and Rūd Bār-e Later Gaz) is a village in Zarem Rud Rural District, Hezarjarib District, Neka County, Mazandaran Province, Iran. At the 2006 census, its population was 47, in 10 families.

References 

Populated places in Neka County